Patron (foaled 1890) was an Australian bred thoroughbred racehorse that is most notable for winning the 1894 Melbourne Cup.

1894 Melbourne Cup

Patron started at odds of 33/1 in the 1894 Melbourne Cup, with his full brother, Ruenalf,  also in the race as the 3/1 favourite.  Patron would win the race by three-quarters of a length with his older brother finishing unplaced.  

There was no trophy awarded to the winner of the race in 1894 as the country was suffering an economic depression.

Later life 
In 1897 Patron was sold to an English client of the International Horse Agency in London.

Pedigree

References 

Racehorses bred in Australia
Racehorses trained in Australia
1890 racehorse births
Melbourne Cup winners